|}

This is a list of electoral district results of the 1921 Western Australian election.

Results by Electoral district

Albany

Avon

Beverley

Boulder

Brownhill-Ivanhoe

Bunbury

Canning

Claremont

Collie

Coolgardie 

 Preferences were not distributed.

Cue

East Perth

Forrest

Fremantle

Gascoyne

Geraldton

Greenough

Guildford

Hannans

Irwin

Kalgoorlie

Kanowna

Katanning

Kimberley

Leederville

Menzies

Moore

Mount Leonora

Mount Magnet 

 Preferences were not distributed.

Mount Margaret

Murchison 

 Preferences were not distributed.

Murray-Wellington 

 Preferences were not distributed.

Nelson

North Perth

North-East Fremantle

Northam

Perth 

|- style="background-color:#E9E9E9"
! colspan="6" style="text-align:left;" |After distribution of preferences

Pilbara

Pingelly 

 Preferences were not distributed.

Roebourne 

 Preferences were not distributed.

South Fremantle

Subiaco

Sussex

Swan

Toodyay

Wagin

West Perth

Williams-Narrogin

Yilgarn

York

See also 

 1921 Western Australian state election
 Members of the Western Australian Legislative Assembly, 1921–1924

References 

Results of Western Australian elections
1921 elections in Australia